Parts & Labor was an American rock band formed in 2002 by B. J. Warshaw and Dan Friel in Brooklyn, New York. Drummer Joe Wong joined the band in 2007. Parts & Labor released five albums, two EPs, one split album (with Tyondai Braxton), and numerous 7"s and compilation tracks. Their music is influenced by DIY punk, experimental/psychedelic rock, and lo-fi electronic music.

Drummer Christopher Weingarten left the band in 2008 but they quickly recruited new drummer Joe Wong and added guitarist Sarah Lipstate, turning them into a four-piece band. This lineup recorded Receivers, the band's fourth album, which was released on October 21, 2008 in North America and November 3, 2008 in the UK through Jagjaguwar. Also released in 2008 was Escapers Two, a record which featured 51 songs in around 29 minutes. On July 10, 2009, Lipstate announced via her website she had left the band.

The band played their 10th anniversary and final show on Friday, February 24, 2012.

Friel and Warshaw also run Cardboard Records, an independent record label that has released music by Pterodactyl, Gowns, Ecstatic Sunshine and others. Former members of Parts & Labor include Christopher Weingarten, Sarah Lipstate, Joel Saladino and Jim Sykes.

Band members
Final line-up 
Dan Friel - keyboards, guitar, vocals 
B.J. Warshaw - bass guitar, vocals 
Joe Wong - drums  
Tom Martin - guitar 

Past members
Jim Sykes - drums 
Joel Saladino - drums 
Christopher R. Weingarten - drums 
Sarah Lipstate - guitar

Timeline

Discography
Albums
 Groundswell (JMZ Records, 2003)
 Stay Afraid (Jagjaguwar Records, 2006)
 Mapmaker (Jagjaguwar Records, 2007)
 Receivers (Jagjaguwar Records, 2008)
 Constant Future (Jagjaguwar Records, 2011)

Splits and EPs
 Rise, Rise, Rise (split LP with Tyondai Braxton)(Narnack Records, 2003)
 Escapers One 12" (Brooklyn Beats, 2007)
 Escapers Two (Ace Fu, 2008)

References

External links
 Official website
 [ All Music Guide page]
 MySpace page
 2008 Parts & Labor Interview at Bandega.com
 NY Times Stay Afraid review
 Village Voice interview/review
 Cleveland Free Times live review
 Interview with Chief Magazine
 Parts & Labor talk Plan B Magazine through Stay Afraid (September 2006)
 Interview with BJ in a toilet cubicle (October 2007)
 Mini-interview with Parts & Labor about Whartscape 2008 (July 2008)

Musical groups from Brooklyn
Musical groups established in 2002
American experimental musical groups
Noise pop musical groups
2002 establishments in New York City